Elizabeth Baker (c. 1720 – c. 1797) was an English secretary, diarist, and amateur geologist.

Life
Baker was from the English Midlands, where her father was a minister. She lived for a time in Coventry, Warwickshire.

She moved to Wales in 1770 to prospect for metals in the Dolgellau area of Merionethshire, but did not have the financial support of her partners to be able to complete the endeavour. She obtained a position with Hugh Vaughan as his secretary at Hengwrt until 1778. She lived there until his property was taken on behalf of his creditors. Baker then lived in Bryn Adda for about six years, followed by Dolgellau. She documented her experiences in ten diaries, which were held by the National Library of Wales and excerpts were published in its journal. They are considered notable for the documentation of the history of the area. Vaughan was a solicitor, and her diary documents some of his legal proceedings.

Correspondence that was archived with her diaries show that she was alive until 1797. She is believed to be the Elizabeth Baker who was buried in Dolgellau in 1799. Identified as Mrs. Baker, her papers and diaries from the period from 1740 to 1798 were archived at the National Library of Wales.

Notes

References

Further reading
 
 
 
 
 
 
 
 

1720s births
1790s deaths
18th-century English writers
18th-century English women writers
18th-century British geologists
18th-century English scientists
18th-century women scientists
British diarists
Women diarists
Year of birth uncertain
Place of birth missing
English women geologists
18th-century diarists